Fungus, branded on air as Fungus 53, was a Commercial-free radio station on XM Satellite Radio, launched in early 2004 and was specialized in playing Uncensored Punk rock, Hardcore rock and Ska music. The channel was one of nine on XM that is marked with an xL, which is the Channel is Uncensored, and indicating frequent Explicit Language. The channel was programmed by Lou Brutus, who is also host of the nationally syndicated radio show, Harddrive, and former program director of Special X. Lou and Russ Brown were the two DJs on the channel.

Shows That Were on Fungus 53
Rancid Radio - A weekly, hourly show hosted by the members of the group Rancid.
Kingdom of Swine - Fungus' longest show, Kingdom of Swine dedicated three whole hours to industrial music.
Oi!sters - Two hours a week dedicated to Oi!.
Complete Control Radio - Joe Sib hosts a weekly radio show, where he picks the tracks from his punk library at his Los Angeles studio.
Hee-Haw Hell - Airtime devoted to rockabilly and cowpunk music, some of which is also heard on XM sister channel X Country.
Duped - A show devoted to punk and ska covers.
Slam-a-lot - Hardcore music for a whole hour.
Skanorreha - An entire show of ska, which mixes in several older songs from the 1990s and 1980s that are not usually rotated into the channel's daytime playlist.
Kowabunga Uber Alles - A weekly show devoted to surf music.

In popular culture
The station was the subject of the first half of the Fungus/I'm a Really Huge Fan of Bad Religion song from one of NOFX's 7" of the month club program. Fat Mike expresses his thoughts on the station, mentioning that "I hate the radio but I like Fungus/The only punk rock station, it's humongous".

AC/DC Radio and the end of Fungus

Between 2008 and 2009–15 and 2009-01-15, the channel features the music of Australian band AC/DC 24/7.  This is the first single artist micro-channel that is preempting channels on both the XM and Sirius platform. Punk on the Sirius platform is being preempted as well. It is being reported that the channel Boneyard will replace AC/DC radio on channel 53, meaning Fungus 53 has been retired from the Sirius XM lineup.  Faction became Fungus's successor on November 12, 2008, although Faction is now XM channel 41.

See also
XM Satellite Radio channel history

References

Defunct radio stations in the United States
Radio stations established in 2001
Radio stations disestablished in 2008